The For-l’Évêque was a prison in Paris. It was in operation from 1674 until 1780, and was demolished at the start of the 19th century.

History

Sources 
 Jules Édouard Alboise du Pujol, Auguste Maquet, Les Prisons de l’Europe, t. 1, Paris, Administration de librairie, 1850.
 Gaston Maugras, Les Comédiens hors la loi, Calmann Lévy, Paris, Librairie Nouvelle, 1887.

External links 
  Frantz Funck-Brentano, "La Bastille des Comédiens : Le For l’Evêque" in Bulletin de la société d’histoire du théâtre, 1902, n°3-4, p. 3-94

Defunct prisons in Paris
1674 establishments in France
1780 disestablishments
Buildings and structures demolished in the 19th century